is a Japanese rugby union player who plays as a Hooker. He currently plays for Toyota Verblitz in Japan's domestic Top League.

International

Hikosaka Yoshikatsu received his first call-up to his country, Japan head coach Jamie Joseph has named Hikosaka Yoshikatsu in a 52-man training squad ahead of British and Irish Lions test.

References

External links
itsrugby.co.uk Profile

1991 births
Living people
Japanese rugby union players
Rugby union hookers
Toyota Verblitz players